Shahar Tavoch (born ) is an Israeli actor, singer, voice actor and TV host.

Biography

Early life
Tavoch was born and raised in Ramat Gan, Israel, and has studied in Blich high school. His mother, Ettie, is  head of accounting at the Open University of Israel, and his father, Shaul, is  a sales agent.

Professional career
In 2012–2013, he hosted the TV show Click on Arutz HaYeladim, in which the participants present videos they have uploaded on YouTube, and the prank show Staaam!, in which the hosts (Oded Paz, Tal Mosseri, Dana Frider, etc.) prank various teen stars.

In 2013, he played the role of Shloimele Efros, son of Yosele and Shaindl in the play Mirele Efros in the Habima Theatre.

In 2014, he participated in the game show Raid the Cage, along with Maya Shoham.

In 2017 he participated in the reality TV show Rising Star. In 2018 he played the character of Erez in the film Herzl's Susita.

In the same year he played the role of Matan in the show Our Treasure on the Kan Educational channel.

In 2019 he played the character of Niv in the youth series Runaway on HOT.

In March 2020, he played the role of Lev in the series Mishpaha BeHanpaka. He appeared in the music video for the song קוצ'י מוצ'י by Taylor Malkov and Ben Zini. In the same year, he dubbed various characters for Lodge 49.

In October 2020, Kan 11 aired the drama series Valley of Tears, in which Tavoch played the role of Avinoam.

In March 2021 he played the role of Brosh in the TV series Sky. That same year he dubbed George's character in A Week Away, and a character in Yes Day

On July 19, 2021, he released his first single, פחדן. In August of the same year, Who's the Boss? aired, in which he plays the role of Gomme.

Tuvoch appeared in the Festigal alongside his co-actress from Sky and Mishpaha BeHanpaka, Bar Minieli.

On January 9, 2022, he released his second single, מישבאלי.

That same year he dubbed Thomas in Thomas & Friends: All Engines Go.

On July 4 of the same year, he released his third single, "Mangal".

Personal life 
In November 2020, Tavoch stated in an interview to Yediot Ahronot that following the connection that he formed with his co-actor Aviv Alush during the filming of Valley of Tears, he has started keeping Sabbath and putting on tefillin. Shahar Tavoch has stated that he is homosexual.

References 

1999 births
Living people
People from Ramat Gan
Israeli male film actors
Israeli male television actors
Israeli male voice actors
Israeli male stage actors
Israeli television presenters
21st-century Israeli male actors
21st-century Israeli male singers
Gay singers
Israeli gay actors
Israeli gay musicians
Israeli LGBT singers